The Girl from St. Agnes is a South African mystery drama television limited series developed by a creative team of women from Quizzical Pictures. It premiered on 31 January 2019 as Showmax's first original drama series.

Premise
The sudden death of a popular student at a prestigious all-girls boarding school in the Midlands of KwaZulu-Natal is quickly ruled a tragic accident. Her teacher, however, has reason to believe otherwise and sets off to find the truth.

Cast

Main
 Nina Milner as Kate Ballard
 Tyrone Keogh as Shane Moolman
 Graham Hopkins as Chris Whittaker
 Jane de Wet as Alexis "Lexi" Summerveld
 Paige Bonnin as Megan Clayton
 Shamilla Miller as Jenna Galloway
 Makgotso M as Moipone Molopo
 Celeste Khumalo as Kholwa
 Tessa Jubber as Philippa Summerveld
 Tristan de Beer as Jason Clayton
 Karl Thaning as Dylan McMahon
 Zakeeya Patel as Sharon McMahon
 Jocelyn Broderick as Joanne Whittaker
 Robert Hobbs as Gary Clayton

Supporting
 Jerry Mofokeng as Mr. Gwala
 Charmaine Weir-Smith as Rachel Summerveld
 Richard Lukunku as Kgalala Molopo

Episodes

Production

Development
Gillian Breslin served as head writer, whilst Catharine Cooke and Cindy Lee co-directed the series. Producer Harriet Gavshon drew upon her own real-life experiences at boarding school for inspiration. Moonyeenn Lee was in charge of casting.

Filming
Principal photography took place on location in Ixopo and Johannesburg, wrapping in November 2018. Multiple locations were used to make up the fictional school, including King's Grant Country Retreat.

Release
A teaser was released on 9 January 2019 followed by a full trailer on 15 January. The 8-episode drama launched on Showmax on 31 January. It was showcased at the 2019 MIPTV in Cannes.

Reception

Awards and nominations

References

External links

The Girl from St. Agnes at TVSA
The Girl from St. Agnes on Showmax

2010s crime drama television series
2010s mystery television series
2010s teen drama television series
2019 South African television series debuts
English-language Showmax original programming
English-language television shows
South African drama television series
Television series about teenagers